John has been the papal name of several Coptic Popes.

 Patriarch John II (I) of Alexandria (496–505)
 Patriarch John III (II) of Alexandria (505–516)
 Pope John III of Alexandria (677–688)
 Pope John IV of Alexandria (776–799)
 Pope John V of Alexandria (1147–1166)
 Pope John VI of Alexandria (1189–1216)
 Pope John VII of Alexandria (1261–1268, 1271–1293)
 Pope John VIII of Alexandria (1300–1320)
 Pope John IX of Alexandria (1320–1327)
 Pope John X of Alexandria (1363–1369)
 Pope John XI of Alexandria (1427–1452)
 Pope John XII of Alexandria (1480–1483)
 Pope John XIII of Alexandria (1483–1524)
 Pope John XIV of Alexandria (1573–1589)
 Pope John XV of Alexandria (1621–1631)
 Pope John XVI of Alexandria (1676–1718)
 Pope John XVII of Alexandria (1727–1745)
 Pope John XVIII of Alexandria (1769–1796)
 Pope John XIX of Alexandria (1928–1942)

See also 

 List of Coptic Popes